The A5 (commonly known as the London-Holyhead Trunk Road) is a major road in England and Wales. In many parts the route follows that of the Roman Iter II route which later took the Anglo-Saxon name Watling Street.

History

Roman Road

The section of the A5 between London and Shrewsbury is roughly contiguous with one of the principal Roman roads in Britain: that between Londinium and Deva, which diverges from the present-day A5 corridor at Wroxeter (Viroconium Cornoviorum) near Shrewsbury.

Telford's Holyhead Road
The Act of Union 1800, which unified Great Britain and Ireland, gave rise to a need to improve communication links between London and Dublin. A parliamentary committee led to an Act of Parliament of 1815 that authorised the purchase of existing turnpike road interests and, where necessary, the construction of new road, to complete the route between the two capitals. This made it the first major civilian state-funded road building project in Britain since Roman times.  Responsibility for establishing the new route was awarded to the famous engineer, Thomas Telford.

Through England, the road largely took over existing turnpike roads and mainly following the route of the Anglo-Saxon Wæcelinga Stræt (Watling Street), much of which had been historically the Roman road Iter II. However between Weedon, Northamptonshire and Oakengates, Telford's Holyhead Road eschews the Watling Street corridor, picking up instead the major cities of Coventry, Birmingham, and Wolverhampton; this routing being far more useful for communications.

From Shrewsbury and through Wales, Telford's work was more extensive. In places he followed existing roads, but he also built new links, including the Menai Suspension Bridge to connect the mainland with Anglesey and the Stanley Embankment to Holy Island.

Telford's road was complete with the opening of the Menai Suspension Bridge in 1826.

Notable features of Telford's road
The road was designed to allow stagecoaches and the mail coach to carry post between London and Holyhead, and thence by mailboat to Ireland. Therefore, throughout its length the gradient never exceeds 1:17 (5.9%).

The route through Wales retains many of the original features of Telford's road and has, since 1995, been recognised as a historic route worthy of preservation. An 18-month survey by Cadw in 1998-2000 revealed that about 40% of the original road and its ancillary features survives under the modern A5, much more than previously thought. These features include the following:

 many surviving and distinctive toll houses
 'depots' along the route, being roadside alcoves to store grit and materials
 distinctive milestones at each mile – many originals having survived and been restored, others now replaced by replicas
 distinctive gates in a 'sunburst' design, a few of which have survived
 a weighbridge at Lon Isaf, between Bangor and Bethesda

Tŷ Nant cutting
In 1997, a section of bends on Telford's road between Tŷ Nant and Dinmael was by-passed by a modern cutting. However, investigation in 2006 revealed that the rock face in the cutting had become unstable, and the A5 was closed from the end of May 2006. Traffic was diverted onto the old A5 route, on a  stretch known as the Glyn Bends, while the rock face was made safe. This involved the removal of 230,000 tonnes of rock and alluvial deposits. In July 2007, the A5 through the reconstructed cutting was reopened.

Route

London–Milton Keynes
Starting at Marble Arch in London, the A5 runs northwest on the Edgware Road through Kilburn and Cricklewood. The A5 number disappears at the A41 near Edgware but the original road continues as the A5183 through Elstree, Radlett, St Albans, Redbourn and Dunstable. A few miles north of Dunstable, the A5 regains its identity at the M1 motorway junction 11A, rejoining the old Roman Road and passing through Hockliffe before becoming a dual carriageway as it approaches Milton Keynes.

Milton Keynes–Hinckley
On entering the City of Milton Keynes, the road becomes an (almost) fully grade-separated dual carriageway and passes through Milton Keynes. This stretch was opened in 1980, replacing the original route along Watling Street.  From just north of MK, after entering Northamptonshire, the road resumes as a single carriageway that continues through Towcester where it crosses the A43 dual carriageway just north of the town. The road accompanies the Grand Union Canal and the M1 motorway through the Watford Gap. It then bridges the M45 motorway and continues to Kilsby. As it passes close to Rugby, the road is diverted slightly around the Daventry International Rail Freight Terminal and then passes the remains of the Rugby Radio Station.

The next phase north-west-bound takes it under the M6 motorway and passing close to Lutterworth. Along this stretch, the road frequently alternates between being a single and a dual carriageway. After meeting the M69 motorway at a roundabout, with the motorway passing above, the A5 runs between Nuneaton and Hinckley.

Hinckley–Shrewsbury
After this section the road continues to run through the northern fringes of Nuneaton and then on to  Tamworth. At Tamworth, the road follows a more recent dual carriageway bypass, permitting the original alignment to become a local road in the town. From this point the road is a grade separated dual carriageway up until its junction with the A38 and M6 toll. After this junction it passes just to the south of Cannock and then enters Telford, where it loses its identity and route-shares with the M54 motorway from junction 5. At junction 7 the motorway ends and the A5 continues to Shrewsbury as dual carriageway, on its new alignment. (The original route through Telford, and then via Atcham to Shrewsbury, is  unclassified through Oakengates and as the B5061 through Wellington and the B4380 through Atcham). Continuing from the end of the M54, the route runs around Shrewsbury as the town's southern bypass (still as dual carriageway), combining for a stretch with the A49. (The route once ran through the town, but was first bypassed in the 1930s, then by-passed again in the early 1990s).

Shrewsbury–Bangor
After Shrewsbury the A5 continues as single-carriageway except for the Nesscliffe bypass. It then multiplexes with the major South Wales  North Wales road A483 and forms part of the Oswestry bypass, running to the east of that town. Shortly after, it crosses the River Ceiriog and enters Wales to continue from Chirk. The A5 continues through to Snowdonia via Llangollen, Corwen, Capel Curig and through the centre of Bangor.

Bangor–Holyhead
From Bangor the road crosses the Menai Suspension Bridge to Anglesey and then runs roughly parallel to the A55 expressway to the outskirts of the village of Valley where the A5 continues onto the Stanley Embankment. The A5 from Valley to Holyhead is named London Road running through to the Port of Holyhead.  The A5 traditionally terminated at Admiralty Arch (1822–24) on Salt Island, which was designed by Thomas Harrison to commemorate a visit by King George IV in 1821 en route to Ireland and marks the zenith of Irish Mail coach operations. The A5 currently terminates at the junction of the A55 near the Port of Holyhead.

Alternative routes
Parts of the A5 have been replaced by sections of the M1 north of London, the M54 through Telford, the M6, and the M6 Toll. The A55 route in North Wales is now the usual way to get from Chirk to Holyhead, avoiding the mountainous A5 route through Snowdonia and instead going via the much gentler Cheshire Plain and along the coast.

Junction list

First segment

Second segment

Road safety
In June 2008, a  stretch of the A5 between Daventry and Rugby was named as the most dangerous road in the East Midlands.  This single carriageway stretch had fifteen fatal and serious injury collisions between 2004 and 2006, and was rated as 'red'—the second highest risk band—in the EuroRAP report publish by the Road Safety Foundation.

Gallery

See also
A5 road (Isle of Man)
A5 road (Northern Ireland)
Trunk roads in Wales

References

External links

Society for All British Road Enthusiasts entry for the A5
Road to Nowhere: A5
Nesscliffe bypass opened 21 March 2003.
Milestonesweb entry
EuroRAP GB Tracking Survey Results 2008
Road Safety Foundation
1815–1830 reports of Select Committees on roads to Holyhead digitised by Enhanced British Parliamentary Papers On Ireland

Roads in England
Roads in Anglesey
Streets in the London Borough of Barnet
Transport in Bedfordshire
Streets in the London Borough of Brent
Transport in Buckinghamshire
Streets in the London Borough of Camden
Roads in Denbighshire
Streets in the London Borough of Harrow
Transport in Leicestershire
Roads in Shropshire
Transport in Staffordshire
Roads in Warwickshire
Streets in the City of Westminster
Roads in Milton Keynes
Transport in Walsall
Works of Thomas Telford
Roads in Gwynedd